Space Warriors may refer to:

 Space Warriors (2013 film)
 Space Warrior (board game)
 Space Warrior Baldios, a 1980 Japanese anime series and a 1981 anime film of the same name

See also
 Space warfare